Conelrad was an American heavy metal duo from Pittsburgh, Pennsylvania. The group, consisting of Jeff Gretz (of From Autumn to Ashes and Zao) and Adam McGregor (formerly of Creation Is Crucifixion), formed in early 2001. They played at Mr. Roboto Project in 2003, and released a 7-inch record and a CD. In mid-2005, the duo went on a break. Sporadic activity since then has seen only two performances and the release of a 7-inch EP.

Their style has been described as a mixture of Carcass and Lightning Bolt, and features spoken word as well as shrieks; Pittsburgh Live referred to the band's music as "experimental lunacy".

Members
 Jeff Gretz – drums, vocals
 Adam MacGregor – guitar, vocals

Discography

Albums and EPs
Bezoar (7-inch vinyl, Hope and Hardtravelin', April 2004)
A Final Dissolution (CD, New Addition Media, September 2004)
Torus Shock Trio Sessions with Steve Moore, alto sax (limited edition CD-R, Lost Tundra, September 2004)
Sluts and Slobs (7-inch vinyl, Oh No Vertigo, September 2006)

Compilations
The West Coast of the East Coast (CD, Hardtravelin' Records) – "Mania a Potu"
Advanced Calculus – Live at 88.3 WRCT (CD, These Bricks Are Mine Records) – "Life Is a Hoax" (live)
The Long Run of Small Steps (Cassette, Hardtravelin' Records) – "More of the Same"
Unicorn Mountain Vol 1 (CD/book, Unicorn Mountain Records) – "Taepodong 2"

References

Musical groups established in 2001
Heavy metal musical groups from Pennsylvania
Musical groups from Pittsburgh